IOGC may stand for:

 Iron oxide copper gold ore deposits (more commonly IOCG)
 Indian Oil and Gas Canada, a Canadian government agency